Ramshackle House is a 1924 American silent romantic drama film directed by F. Harmon Weight and starring Betty Compson. It is based on the novel Ramshackle House by Hulbert Footner. It was released by Producers Distributing Corporation (PDC).

Cast
Betty Compson as Pen Broome
Robert Lowing as Don Counsell
John Davidson as Ernest Riever
Henry James as Pendleton Broome
William Black as Keesing
Duke Pelzer as Spike Talley
Josephine Norman as Blanche Paglar
Joey Joey as Alligator Wrestler

Preservation
With no copies of Ramshackle House located in any film archives, it is a lost film.

References

External links

Lobby poster
Footner, Hulbert (1922), Ramshackle House, New York: A. L. Burt Company, on the Internet Archive

1924 films
American silent feature films
Lost American films
Films based on Canadian novels
1924 romantic drama films
American romantic drama films
American black-and-white films
Producers Distributing Corporation films
Films directed by F. Harmon Weight
1920s American films
Silent romantic drama films
Silent American drama films